Andy Price is a British television and film composer. He has scored more than 50 films for television and more than 25 productions for theatres around the country, including the Bristol Old Vic, National Youth Theatre and the RSC.

Price has composed the score for three series of BBC's Robin Hood, Law & Order: UK with Adam Lewis and as of 2020 is scoring Silent Witness.

In 2002, Price became the recipient of the Christopher Whelen Award in recognition of his recent work scoring to picture. He is also a visiting lecturer at the Royal College of Music.

Selected credits 
Law & Order: UK
Robin Hood
The Inspector Lynley Mysteries
David Starkey's Elizabeth
Hetty Feather

Awards and nominations 
2000 - BAFTA (Original Television Music)
2002 - Christopher Whelan Award - Won

References

External links

Agent's website

Year of birth missing (living people)
British composers
British film score composers
British male film score composers
British television composers
Living people
National Youth Theatre members